Athlete 360 is a television program that runs on Fox Sports Net channels across the United States. The only television show focused exclusively on sports medicine, Athlete 360 takes the form of long interviews with a different athlete each episode. The athletes, some working and some retired, have all had extensive, career-changing injuries. By talking to the athletes about their personal histories, their injuries, and more, the show attempts to take a holistic look at sports, sports medicine, and some of the men and women who have become American national heroes.

Season One of Athlete 360 is currently airing for the second time. The show initially aired beginning in September, 2009 on Fox Sports Houston before being picked up by other Fox Sports networks and affiliates across the country. The first season's second run began on April 12, 2010.

Host Jock to Doc Mark Adickes

Jock

Dr. Mark Adickes, the show's host, is a former professional football player turned orthopedic surgeon. As a member of the Washington Redskins NFL team, Adickes helped his team win Super Bowl XXVI in 1992. Dr. Adickes also played for the Kansas City Chiefs and, as an undergraduate, he was named an All-American for the Baylor University Bears.

Doc
Following his football career, Adickes decided to go to medical school. To prepare to take the MCAT, Adickes studied science and math at George Mason University before going on to Harvard University Medical School. After speaking at his medical school commencement, Dr. Adickes went on to become Chief Resident at the Mayo Clinic in Minnesota and studied sports medicine further with Richard Steadman at the Colorado-based Steadman-Hawkins Clinic. Now, Dr. Adickes is the Co-Medical Director of the Memorial Hermann Hospital Sports Medicine Institute. Dr. Adickes is official doctor for the NBA team the Houston Rockets, the United States Ski Team, and for RodeoHouston.

Season one

Featured Athletes

 Chad Fleischer: Downhill Skier
 Dikembe Mutombo: Former NBA Player
 Kevin Everett: Former NFL Player
 Toby Dawson: Freestyle Skier
 Mark Schlereth: Former NFL Player
 Steve Sparks: Former Major League Baseball Player
 Mike Moore: Professional Bull Rider
 Tommy Kendall: Former Race Car Driver
 Stacy Lewis: Pro Golfer on the LPGA Tour

Production
Athlete 360 was created by Serious Fun Productions, a 13-year-old production company based out of Boston, MA that creates television series, segments, and commercials. The company is focused on building and branding talent and "developing media properties that become a showcase for that on-camera expert."

Serious Fun Productions, LLC is led by President & Executive Producer Tricia Bradley.

References

External links

News
 USA Today: Sports Medicine Show has Apt Host
 CBS Sports: Former NFL Lineman Goes from Jock to Doc

Blogs
 Buffalo Rumblings: Former Bills TE Everett Featured on Sports Medicine Program
 Hogs Haven: We Catch Up with Former Redskin and Hog Mark Adickes; Hilarity Ensues

Social media
 Athlete 360 on Facebook
 Athlete 360 on Twitter

Other
 Baylor University: Where Are They Now: Mark Adickes
 Livestrong: Sprained Finger Health Video featuring Dr. Adickes
 Memorial Hermann Newsroom: Memorial Hermann Sports Medicine Institute Stars in New Fox Sports Series
 Serious Fun TV: About Mark Adickes

American sports television series